Tom McHugh, County Councillor and Mayor of County Galway 2009-10.

A native of Kilcloughans, Tuam, McHugh had worked in the construction and trade industries since the 1960s. He was elected to Galway Council in June 1999, and served as Mayor of County Galway for the term 2009-10.

See also

 Ruaidhri Mac Aedha, lord of Clann Cosgraigh, died 1170.
 Máel Sechlain Mac Áeda, Archbishop of Tuam, died 1348.
 Paddy McHugh, T.D., born 1953.

External links
 http://www.galway.ie/en/AboutYourCouncil/Councillors/MeettheCouncillors/Name,601,en.html
 https://web.archive.org/web/20090622123045/http://www.galwaynews.ie/7888-tuam039s-tom-mc-hugh-elected-mayor-county-galway
 https://archive.today/20130217183834/http://www.galwaynews.ie/12048-mayor-county-galway-calls-rail-line-be-opened-sligo

Living people
Fine Gael politicians
Local councillors in County Galway
People from Tuam
Politicians from County Galway
Year of birth missing (living people)